The year 1575 in science and technology included a number of events, some of which are listed here.

Astronomy
 Cornelius Gemma is credited with publishing the first scientific illustration of the aurora, in his discussion of the 1572 supernova.

Geology
 December 16 – Valdivia earthquake in Chile.

Mathematics
 Guilielmus Xylander uses parallel vertical lines to indicate equality.

Medicine
 First publication of Ambroise Paré's collected works, Les oeuvres de M. Ambroise Paré, in Paris, including some of the earliest descriptions of forensic medicine.

Publications
 Cornelius Gemma publishes  in Antwerp.

Deaths
 Tomás de Mercado, Spanish economist and theologian (born 1525)
 Costanzo Varolio, Italian anatomist and a papal physician to Gregory XIII (born 1543)

References

 
16th century in science
1570s in science